Microtropesa is a genus of parasitic flies in the family Tachinidae. There are about 15 described species in Microtropesa.

Species
These 15 species belong to the genus Microtropesa:

 Microtropesa campbelli Paramonov, 1951
 Microtropesa canberrae Paramonov, 1951
 Microtropesa danielsi Burwell, 1996
 Microtropesa flavitarsis Malloch, 1929
 Microtropesa flaviventris Malloch, 1930
 Microtropesa intermedia Malloch, 1930
 Microtropesa latigena Paramonov, 1951
 Microtropesa longimentum Burwell, 1996
 Microtropesa nigricornis Macquart, 1851
 Microtropesa obtusa Walker, 1853
 Microtropesa ochriventris Malloch, 1929
 Microtropesa sinuata (Donovan, 1805)
 Microtropesa skusei Bergroth, 1894
 Microtropesa violacescens Enderlein, 1937
 Microtropesa viridescens Paramonov, 1951

References

Further reading

 
 
 
 

Tachinidae
Articles created by Qbugbot